William Gault (born December 19, 1936) is a former American football player who played with the Minnesota Vikings. He played college football at Texas Christian University.

References

1936 births
Living people
American football halfbacks
TCU Horned Frogs football players
Minnesota Vikings players
Players of American football from Louisiana
Sportspeople from Monroe, Louisiana